The 1914–15 season was Manchester City F.C.'s 24th season om football league and fifth consecutive season in the First Division of English football. With the start of the First World War, it was to be the last season of regular league football until 1919. In the intervening years, all teams played in the War Leagues, which were non-competitive and are considered to be null in club history.

Football League First Division

Results summary

Reports

FA Cup

Squad statistics

Squad
Appearances for competitive matches only

Scorers

All

League

FA Cup

See also
Manchester City F.C. seasons

References

External links
Extensive Manchester City statistics site

Manchester City F.C. seasons
Manchester City F.C.